Amy Hung (Wade-Giles: Hung Chih-Huei; born 7 March 1980) is a professional golfer on the LPGA Tour.

Amateur wins
1992 Junior World Golf Championships (11-12 age group)
1993 Greg Norman Junior Masters
1994 Greg Norman Junior Masters
2003 Republic of China Ladies Open (amateur division)

Professional career 
Hung turned professional in October 2003 after finishing tied for 42nd at the LPGA Qualifying Tournament, earning non-exempt status for the 2004 season. She returned to the tournament in 2004 and finished tied for 12th to earn exempt status for 2005.

Her best finish to date on the LPGA Tour is a tie for fifth at the 2007 HSBC Women's World Match Play Championship.

On 20 January 2008, Jennifer Rosales and Dorothy Delasin of team Philippines won the 4th Women's World Cup of Golf in Sun City, South Africa. Hung and Yun-Jye Wei of team Taiwan tied for third with team Japan.

Team appearances
Professional
World Cup (representing Taiwan): 2006, 2007, 2008
Lexus Cup (representing Asia team): 2007 (winners)

References

External links 

Profile on Yahoo! Sports
Photos from WireImage

Taiwanese female golfers
LPGA Tour golfers
Sportspeople from Kaohsiung
Golfers from Los Angeles
1980 births
Living people